A list of films produced in Pakistan in 1963 (see 1963 in film) and in the Urdu language:

1963

See also
 1963 in Pakistan

References

External links
 Search Pakistani film - IMDB.com

1963
Pakistani
Films